Afropunctum is a genus of gastropods belonging to the family Euconulidae.

The species of this genus are found in Northern Europe and Africa.

Species:

Afropunctum quadrisculptum 
Afropunctum seminium

References

Euconulidae